Ross Douglas is a Canadian voice actor with Ocean Studios in Vancouver, British Columbia, Canada. He is most well-known for voicing Jean Bison in the Sly Cooper series, Daniel O'Connell in Master Keaton, and Kageyama in the Black Lagoon series.

Roles

Television
Black Lagoon as Kageyama
Inuyasha as Goryomaru (Eps, 166-167)
Inuyasha: The Final Act as Goryomaru (Ep. 1), Moryomaru
MegaMan NT Warrior as Torchman
Mobile Suit Gundam as The Narrator
Master Keaton as Daniel O'Connell
Project ARMS as Keith Blue
Smallville as Skeets
The 4400 as Gregory Kensington
The Little Prince as Bamako (The Planet of the Amicopes)
The Story of Saiunkoku as Shin Sai

Video Games
Mobile Suit Gundam: Encounters in Space as Bask Om and Narrator
Nancy Drew: The Creature of Kapu Cave as Big Island Mike
Sly 2: Band of Thieves  as Jean Bison
[[The Suffering (video game)|The Suffering]]'' as Clem

External links

Ross Douglas at the CrystalAcids Anime Voice Actor Database

Living people
Canadian male voice actors
Year of birth missing (living people)